E. L. Richardson may refer to:
 E. L. Richardson (sports executive)
 E. L. Richardson (trade unionist)